Charles Burrell & Sons were builders of traction engines.

Charles Burrell may also refer to:

Sir Charles Burrell, 3rd Baronet (1774–1862)
Sir Charles Burrell, 10th Baronet (born 1962)
Charles Burrell (musician) (1920–), jazz musician

See also
Burrell (disambiguation)